Scarlett Point is a point forming the west side of Phyllis Bay at the south end of Montagu Island, in the South Sandwich Islands. Charted in 1930 by DI personnel on the Discovery II and named for E.W.A. Scarlett, accountant on the staff of the Discovery Committee.

See also
Horsburgh Point

References

Headlands of South Georgia and the South Sandwich Islands